Wilfried Tekovi (born 10 October 1989) is a Togolese international footballer who plays professionally as a defender for French side FC Gueugnon.

Career

Club career
Born in Bordeaux, France, Tekovi began his career by SCO Angers before moving in 2004 to join English side Peterborough United. He later joined the reserve team of Girondins Bordeaux, playing for one year before signing in 2007 with FC Gueugnon.

International career
Tekovi made his international debut in November 2008.

References

External links

1989 births
Living people
Citizens of Togo through descent
Togolese footballers
Togo international footballers
FC Gueugnon players
Association football defenders
Angers SCO players
French footballers
French sportspeople of Togolese descent
Footballers from Bordeaux
FC Girondins de Bordeaux players
Expatriate footballers in England